Josh Edward S. Cobangbang (born Josh Edward Seguban Cobangbang on ) is a Filipino politician who was the youngest mayor elected in the history of Philippines at the age of 21 and 7 months of the Municipality of Cabugao, Province of Ilocos Sur. The previous youngest mayor title was held by Jono Jumamoy who was elected as mayor of Inabanga on 14 May 2007 at the age of 21 and 8 months. Cobangbang is currently a municipal councilor.

Early life and career
Josh is the son of mayor Edgardo Cobangbang Jr. and Jerlie Cobangbang. He finished his elementary and secondary education at the St. Paul College of Ilocos Sur. He obtained his Bachelor of Science in Business Management at the De La Salle University in Manila at the age of 19.

Despite his young age, Cobangbang has already shown a wealth of maturity. Prior to his election as Mayor, he concurrently helped manage their family company, 5J Seguban Agriventures.

In the May 9, 2016 National Elections, Cobangbang took a leap of faith to run for the mayoral seat in his town of Cabugao, Ilocos Sur. He represented the National People's Coalition (NPC) -  guided by his family and supported by numerous grassroots-based political leaders and stakeholders that saw the positive changes of Cabugao. The young Cobangbang won through a landslide victory garnering 17,356 votes over his rival Dr. Rudy Singson who only garnered 405 votes, officially making him the youngest mayor in Philippine History.

In 2018, Cobangbang earned his mastral degree in Public Management with specialized track on Local Governance at the Ateneo School Of Governance.

In 2019, he won as no.1 Councilor-elect in their town as a Sangguniang Bayan Member. In the recent May 9, 2022 National Elections, he again gunned for the mayoral seat after finishing his term as a Councilor. Their entire slate won, sweetened with the victory of 10-0. The inauguration happened last June 25, in St. Mark the Evangelist Church. Pudno A Panagserbi has always been their motto in serving the people of Cabugao. Evidently, their constituents responds to them, entrusting progress and success to again the Cobangbang Administration.

Mayor of Cabugao, Ilocos Sur (2016-present)

Cobangbang took office on July 1, 2016 in Cabugao, a first-class municipality with a thriving industry in agriculture and fishing. the previous administration led by the senior Cobangbang had made a number of remarkable developments in the municipality- providing better healthcare facilities, improving the town's infrastructure, and concreting of farm-to-market roads among others.

One of Josh's main priorities as Mayors is to help the out-of-school youth sector by providing livelihood trainings, and improving the municipality's tourism development plans by developing its beaches. Josh also aims to provide a potable water system to the community composed of 33 barangays.

The young Cobangbang has said in interviews that he is keen on continuing his father's plans and programs for their town. Josh is all for progress for his municipality. During his first terms in office, the town saw the establishment of several new businesses. Among the notable businesses that opened up in Cabugao is the Development Bank of the Philippines. Josh also headed in welcoming hundreds of his townsmen coming home from abroad during the town's annual feast celebration

In February 2019, the Department of Justice has approved the indictment of the young mayor over the padlocking of a local beach resort with its operator and four-year-old son trapped inside. In a 16-page resolution, the DOJ found probable cause to file serious illegal detention and grave coercion charges against Mayor Josh Edward Cobangbang and 18 others who have been accused by Virginia Ong of committing criminal liability arising from the closure of the local government-owned Cabugao Beach Resort (CBR) in 2017.

References 

Mayors of places in Ilocos Sur
De La Salle University alumni
1994 births
Living people
Ateneo de Manila University alumni